Michael Seitzman (born November 1, 1977) is an American writer, producer and film director best known for film North Country. He started Maniac Productions in 2017. He most recently signed a TV deal with Blumhouse.

Filmography

Writer 
 Farmer & Chase (1997)
 Here on Earth (2000)
 North Country (2005)
 House Rules (2009) (TV)
 Empire State (2009) (TV)
 The Sparrow (2012) (TV)
 Americana (2012) (TV series)
 Intelligence (2013)
 Code Black (2015)
 Quantico (2018)
 Book of Enchantments (TBA)

Producer
 Farmer & Chase (1997)
 House Rules (2009) (TV)
 Empire State (2009) (TV)
 Americana (2012) (TV pilot)
 Intelligence (2013)
 Code Black (2015)
 Quantico (2018)
 Book of Enchantments (TBA)

Director
 Farmer & Chase (1997)

References

External links

Michael Seitzman at The Huffington Post

Writers from Newark, New Jersey
American male screenwriters
American film directors
Film producers from New Jersey
Screenwriters from New Jersey
1972 births
Living people